Sabine Lautenschläger (born 3 June 1964) is a German jurist who served as a member of the Executive Board of the European Central Bank from 2014 to 2019. She previously served as vice-president of the Deutsche Bundesbank from 2011 to 2013.

In 2022, Lautenschläger joined law firm Covington’s Frankfurt office as Senior Advisor.

Education and early career 
Lautenschläger graduated with a Staatsexamen from the University of Bonn in 1990. She began her career in banking supervision in 1995 at the Federal Banking Supervisory Office, the predecessor to today's Federal Financial Supervisory Authority (BaFin) and served as a member of the Basel Committee on Banking Supervision between 2008 and early 2014.

Vice President of Bundesbank, 2011–2013 
Lautenschläger was appointed as vice president of the Bundesbank in 2011, the first woman to hold that position. In that capacity, she was in charge of banking and financial supervision. She also served as member of the Financial Stability Committee of the European System of Central Banks between 2012 and early 2014.

During her time at Bundesbank, Lautenschläger pushed for the ECB's stress tests on bank assets to be tough and credible, while calling for the euro region's prospective bank-resolution mechanism to have a strong legal basis. She has been among those who have warned about potential conflicts of interest when the ECB has responsibility for both monetary policy and banking supervision, and has argued against treating government bonds as risk-free assets on banks' books. She also warned of the risks of keeping interest rates too low for too long.

In line with the Bundesbank board, Lautenschläger consistently opposed the ECB's bond-buying plan, known as Outright Monetary Transactions (OMT).

Member of the Executive Board of the ECB, 2014–2019 
Lautenschläger was nominated by the German government as a member of the Executive Board of the European Central Bank in December 2013, succeeding Jörg Asmussen.

At the time, Claudia Maria Buch and Elke König were cited by German media as contenders for the post. The eurozone governments were under pressure from MEPs to appoint a woman to the board, which had been all-male after Austria's Gertrude Tumpel-Gugerell left midway through 2011. Unlike her predecessor Jörg Asmussen, Lautenschläger has no formal party affiliation. Lautenschläger's nomination was welcomed by policymakers across the political spectrum. Her candidacy was endorsed by the European Parliament Committee on Economic and Monetary Affairs on 13 January and by the full assembly on 16 January. Early on, commentators noted that Lautenschläger's regulatory experience could also make her an option for the deputy chair of the ECB's Supervisory Board, which must be filled by an executive board member.

Since her appointment as Vice-Chair of the Supervisory Board in February 2014, Lautenschläger has – alongside Chairwoman Danièle Nouy – also been responsible for the Single Supervisory Mechanism (SSM). She represents the SSM in the Basel Committee on Banking Supervision.

In early September 2014, Danièle Nouy and Lautenschläger became mentioned in media ahead of the results of sweeping stress tests that probed the balance sheets of the eurozone's largest lenders.
	
By November 2014, Lautenschläger signaled she would oppose having the ECB purchase government bonds of eurozone countries unless there was a clear threat of persistent consumer price declines, thereby contradicting earlier message conveyed by ECB President Mario Draghi and his top deputy Vítor Constâncio to bring inflation higher. Alongside Bundesbank president Jens Weidmann, she later led the opposition in the Governing Council against the decision on 22 January 2015 to start large-scale bond-buying amid concerns it removes pressure from euro-area countries to reform their economies and boost competitiveness. By April 2015, she publicly called into question the effectiveness of the bond-buying program and also warned that low interest rates could lead to asset price bubbles.

In November 2015, Lautenschläger again broke with normal etiquette to publicly criticise the bank's scheme of quantitative easing, saying that ever looser monetary policy had its limits and that money printing had yet to stabilize sinking price inflation, its formal goal.

In September 2019, Lautenschläger quit the Executive Board of the ECB. The ECB did not say why Lautenschläger had quit, though speculation includes her opposition to loose monetary policy, the ending of her role on the Supervisory Board and the impending changes at the top the ECB. She became the third consecutive German board member to resign before the end of their full term.

Other activities

Regulatory agencies
 Financial Stability Board (FSB), Ex-Officio Member of the Standing Committee on Supervisory and Regulatory Cooperation (2015-2019)

Non-profit organizations
 Alfried Krupp von Bohlen und Halbach Foundation, Member of the Board of Trustees

References

External links 
 Website at bundesbank.de

1964 births
Businesspeople from Stuttgart
Executive Board of the European Central Bank members
Jurists from Baden-Württemberg
Living people
University of Bonn alumni